Márk Sándor Murai (born 15 July 1996) is a Hungarian football player who plays for Budaörs.

Club statistics

Updated to games played as of 1 June 2014.

References
Profile at HLSZ 

1996 births
Footballers from Budapest
Living people
Hungarian footballers
Association football forwards
Kaposvári Rákóczi FC players
Zalaegerszegi TE players
Dunaújváros PASE players
Eastbourne Borough F.C. players
TSG Sprockhövel players
Mezőkövesdi SE footballers
Kazincbarcikai SC footballers
Vác FC players
Budapesti VSC footballers
Csákvári TK players
Budaörsi SC footballers
Nemzeti Bajnokság I players
Nemzeti Bajnokság II players
Regionalliga players
Hungarian expatriate footballers
Hungarian expatriate sportspeople in England
Expatriate footballers in England
Hungarian expatriate sportspeople in Germany
Expatriate footballers in Germany